is the sixth installment in the Soulcalibur series of fighting games, released for the PlayStation 3 and Xbox 360 in 2008. It features greatly improved graphics over the previous title, and includes three guest characters from the Star Wars franchise as playable fighters. This was the first Soulcalibur game not to receive an arcade version, and the last Soul series’ 1590 A.D. trilogy game, following II and III. A spin-off for the PlayStation Portable, Soulcalibur: Broken Destiny, was released in 2009.

Gameplay
Soulcalibur IV features Story, Arcade, Training, and Museum modes. A new mode, Tower of Lost Souls, requires the player to win battles in order to gain rewards. The game runs in HD resolution with 5.1 channel surround sound on both platforms.

The Character Creation mode from Soulcalibur III returns in Soulcalibur IV. However, instead of including original weapon styles for use with certain classes of fighters, Soulcalibur IV only allows players to choose which character from the series they would like to have their created character mimic. This differs from Soulcalibur III, where there were many unique styles such as "Grieve Edge". The styles of Algol, the bonus characters and the Star Wars guest characters cannot be used by player-created characters. A wide array of new pieces of equipment are available for use in Soulcalibur IVs Character Creation mode, and new options include a wider range of character voices and the ability to change their pitch. The player may also change a character's general physique and muscularity.

In addition, equipped items now also affect a character's statistics. Armor, weapons, and accessories may increase health, attack, or defense; they may also grant skill points that allow the character to equip special traits that affect the character's playstyle. These traits may include automatically triggered guard impacts, the ability to cause damage against a blocking opponent, or even a statistic increase based on parameters such as an opponent's alignment or gender. Standard characters may also be modified in this manner, albeit only modestly, allowing custom costumes and skill sets to be used in Special VS. mode. Custom characters may still be used in Standard VS. mode, but without any of the special abilities gained through equipment or weapon choice. One profile is allowed for Offline VS. mode, meaning that only one profile's created characters can be loaded at any one time.

Multi-fighter battles in Soulcalibur IV use a different structure from its predecessors, nicknamed Active Matching Battle (AMB). Similar to the tag system of games such as The King of Fighters 2003, the AMB system allows players to switch to other members of a party of fighters mid battle. Instead of starting a new round for each opponent defeated, new opponents simply run into the battle immediately after a K.O., with the exception of certain combatants. Matches utilizing the AMB system only appear in the Story and Tower of Lost Souls modes.

Soulcalibur IV features an all-new Critical Finish system. Next to a player's health meter is a colored gem: the Soul Gauge. The gem changes color when the player blocks an attack or has his or her own attack blocked by a Guard Impact. The color gradually changes from blue to green, then to red and eventually flashing red. The player's own Soul Gauge regenerates if he or she makes an attack and hits the opponent, guarding or otherwise. If the character manages to empty out the opponent's Soul Gauge, the enemy is  destroying a piece of armor (characters now show permanent signs of visual damage such as broken and torn clothing) and producing a short stun during which the character can perform a powerful Critical Finish move, which is able to defeat the opponent instantly, by pressing all four face buttons at the same time. Each character has his or her own personal Critical Finish move. Namco developed the Soul Gauge to decrease the benefits from constant guarding, thus giving the game a faster tempo and making the matches more offensive.

The Star Wars guest characters, Darth Vader, Yoda and the Apprentice, utilize unique attacks using the Force. Darth Vader is able to utilize Force-based blasts, punches, and chokes; Yoda can use the Force to launch himself into the air for complex aerial attacks; finally, the Apprentice is able to use Force lightning and other dark-side moves. These moves drain a special Force Meter, which recharges gradually when not in use. If the Force Meter is depleted, the player momentarily loses control of the character.

For the first time in the series, Soulcalibur IV includes an online multiplayer option. Versus modes available in online battles are Standard VS (for classic matches) and Special VS (for customized characters). Created characters are playable in the online multiplayer mode. A player's wins and losses are recorded and used to establish a ranking level, which reflects online skill.

Characters

Soulcalibur IV contains a roster of 34 fighters. Many characters from the Soul series returning, with 2 newcomers and 3 guest characters from The Star Wars franchise (Darth Vader, Yoda and The Apprentice). Initially, Darth Vader appeared on the PlayStation 3, and Yoda appeared on the Xbox 360 full game download; Namco later made both characters downloadable content on the opposite platform for a fee. The Apprentice, the main protagonist of Star Wars: The Force Unleashed, is playable on both the PlayStation 3 and Xbox 360 versions.

Revenant, Frederick Schtauffen and several other minor Soul series characters make an appearance in battle, and most can be made in Character Creation mode. Several bonus characters designed by manga artists (Angol Fear, Ashlotte, Kamikirimusi, Scheherazade, and Shura) are also playable in the game, and use the fighting styles of returning characters. They are designed by Mine Yoshizaki, Ito Ōgure, Hirokazu Hisayuki, Yutaka Izubuchi and Hiroya Oku respectively.

Algol  
Amy 
Angol Fear 
Ashlotte 
Astaroth
Cassandra
Cervantes 
Darth Vader
Hilde 
Ivy
Kamikirimusi 
Kilik
Lizardman 
Maxi
Mitsurugi
Nightmare
Raphael
Rock 
Scheherazade 
Seong Mi-na 
Setsuka 
Shura 
Siegfried
Sophitia 
Taki
Talim 
The Apprentice  
Tira
Voldo
Xianghua
Yoda
Yoshimitsu 
Yun-seong 
Zasalamel 

 Guest character 
 Unlockable 
 Bonus unlockable characters 
 Newcomers

Plot
The story of Soulcalibur IV, told via in-game written profiles and movies, centers around the appearance of the ancient king Algol, his tower, and his connection to the origin of the spirit sword named Soulcalibur. Every character's motivation and relationship to the other characters is diagrammed in a mode called Chain of Souls. As usual, none of the individual endings from the previous game are considered canonical events, and most of the characters' motivations from that game remain unresolved. However, a small number of characters did experience important events associated with universal Soulcalibur III events. Siegfried has died and been resurrected by the Soulcalibur sword. Sophitia's daughter Pyrrha has been kidnapped by Tira and malfested by Soul Edge, leaving Sophitia to fight for the side of evil in defense of her now-corrupted daughter. Tira is now suffering from a split-personality disorder. Most characters are still motivated by a desire to either obtain, destroy, or defend one or both of the legendary swords now carried by Siegfried and Nightmare, and most characters face Algol as the final boss of Story mode. All characters feature animated ending movies.

Release
The Premium Edition of Soulcalibur IV included a 48-page softcover art/comic book illustrated in full color, an XL 100% cotton T-shirt, and a tournament chart that allowed "fans the opportunity to document the battle amongst friends." The reverse side of the chart was a poster. It was packaged in a metal case and was released on the same date as the regular edition, along with exclusive access to extra customization content in this version. This extra content was the automatic unlocking of the most powerful weapons and joke weapons for each character, as well as clothing items to create a schoolboy or schoolgirl character. In New Zealand, Australia, and Europe there was a steelbook case edition instead, including a bonus DVD containing four trailers in HD, four wallpapers, exclusive concept art, and an exclusive booklet with character biographies.

Shortly after the initial release, various pieces of paid downloadable content were made available including music tracks from the original Soulcalibur, customization equipment, and weapon packs. On October 23, 2008, the options to play as Yoda in the PS3 version of the game and Darth Vader in the Xbox 360 version were made available via paid downloadable content. However, both DLC were later removed from PSN and XBL due to licensing from the purchase of Star Wars by Disney.

Reception

Soulcalibur IV received mostly positive reviews from media outlets. In 2014, six years after its initial release, it held an average Metacritic score of 85 for both its PlayStation 3 and Xbox 360 versions. The game was praised for its polished graphics, deep Character Creation mode, and its long-awaited online play capability. Reviewers also noted that the gameplay was accessible for newcomers and beginners but still had plenty of depth and technicality for veterans and experienced players, including an abundance of single player challenges in Tower of Lost Souls mode. The music was also praised, and Gaming Revolution summarised the game as "some of the best weapons-based fighting action in town".

Certain criticisms were directed towards the guest characters from the Star Wars franchise, with several critics maintaining that their presence was unnatural and that Yoda and the Apprentice in particular were "broken" (a reference to a perceived imbalance in fighting games that gives some characters a vastly unfair advantage over other characters in gameplay) and "absurd," respectively. Yoda's smaller size (and thus his immunity to grab attacks) is mentioned as one such design problem. At the same time, Yoda's short range and low damage output were deemed problematic, making him both overpowered and underpowered at the same time.

Soulcalibur IV topped the UK sales charts for several weeks on both the PS3 and Xbox 360. As of March 31, 2009, the game had sold 2.3 million copies worldwide.

Awards and accolades
IGN Best of 2008: Best Xbox 360 Fighting Game
Spike TV Video Game Awards: Best Fighting Game
IGN's Top 20 Most Popular Xbox 360 Games of 2008: 17th
Virgin Media's Top 20 beat 'em-ups of all time (2009): sixth

In 2010, the game was included as one of the titles in the book 1001 Video Games You Must Play Before You Die.

Sequel
Project Soul (the development team of the Soul series) had always given the impression that Soulcalibur IV would be their last installment as the team was rumored to have disbanded. However, Katsuhiro Harada (producer of the Tekken series) said he would seriously consider a sequel if there was sufficient interest and informed fans that he was willing to accept opinions and requests through Twitter, asking for the messages to be short and simple due to his poor English skills. While the possibility of a sequel was stronger than ever, Namco had not made any statement to solidify their commitment for the game. Fans were encouraged to maintain support and show interest to secure development of Soulcalibur V. On May 11, 2011, Namco Bandai officially announced the new game, which was released for the Xbox 360 and PlayStation 3 on January 31, 2012.

See also
Soulcalibur: Broken Destiny, a PSP version of the game
Star Wars: Masters of Teräs Käsi

References

External links
  
 Soulcalibur IV at NamcoBandai.com
 
 

2008 video games
3D fighting games
Bandai Namco games
Crossover fighting games
Darth Vader
Fighting games used at the Evolution Championship Series tournament
God of War (franchise)
Multiplayer and single-player video games
PlayStation 3 games
Soulcalibur series games
Star Wars video games
Tag team videogames
Ubisoft games
Fighting games
Video game sequels
Video games adapted into comics
Video games developed in Japan
Video games scored by Junichi Nakatsuru
Video games scored by Masaharu Iwata
Video games using Havok
Xbox 360 games